"On Green Dolphin Street" (originally titled "Green Dolphin Street") is a 1947 popular song composed by Bronisław Kaper with lyrics by Ned Washington. The song was composed for the film Green Dolphin Street, which was based on a 1944 novel of the same name by Elizabeth Goudge, and became a jazz standard in the 1950s.

Renditions

In popular culture 
"On Green Dolphin Street" is referenced in the sixth part of JoJo's Bizarre Adventure, Stone Ocean in the name of Green Dolphin Street Prison, the primary setting of the story.

References

1940s jazz standards
1947 songs
Songs with lyrics by Ned Washington
Songs with music by Bronisław Kaper
Jazz standards
Jazz compositions in E-flat major